Grylloblattina is a genus of insects in the family Grylloblattidae. It is a monotypic genus consisting of the species Grylloblattina djakonovi.

Range and habitat
Grylloblattina djakonovi is endemic to far eastern Russia, where it is found along stream banks in mature forests.

Specimens have been collected on Petrov Island in Kievka Bay, Primorsky Krai, Russia.

References

Grylloblattidae
Monotypic insect genera
Fauna of Russia